The 2019 UEFA Women's Under-19 Championship (also known as UEFA Women's Under-19 Euro 2019) was the 18th edition of the UEFA Women's Under-19 Championship (22nd edition if the Under-18 era is included), the annual international youth football championship organised by UEFA for the women's under-19 national teams of Europe. Scotland, which were selected by UEFA on 9 December 2016, was the host of the tournament, which took place from 16 to 28 July 2019.

A total of eight teams played in the tournament, with players born on or after 1 January 2000 eligible to participate. Starting from this season, up to five substitutions are permitted per team in each match.

Similar to the previous editions held in odd-numbered years, the tournament acted as the UEFA qualifiers for the FIFA U-20 Women's World Cup. The top four teams of the tournament would have qualified for the 2021 FIFA U-20 Women's World Cup (originally 2020 but postponed due to COVID-19 pandemic) in Costa Rica as the UEFA representatives. However, FIFA announced on 17 November 2020 that this edition of the World Cup would be cancelled.

France defeated Germany 2–1 in the final to claim its fifth title. Spain were the defending champions, but lost 1–3 to France in the semi-finals after extra-time.

Qualification

A total of 51 UEFA nations entered the competition (including Liechtenstein who entered a competitive women's national team tournament for the first time), and with the hosts Scotland qualifying automatically, the other 50 teams competed in the qualifying competition to determine the remaining seven spots in the final tournament. The qualifying competition consisted of two rounds: Qualifying round, which took place in autumn 2018, and Elite round, which took place in spring 2019.

Qualified teams
The following teams qualified for the final tournament.

Note: All appearance statistics include only U-19 era (since 2002).

Final draw
The final draw was held on 16 April 2019, 12:00 BST (UTC+1), at Barras Art and Design in Glasgow, Scotland. The eight teams were drawn into two groups of four teams. There was no seeding, except that the hosts Scotland were assigned to position A1 in the draw.

Venues
The tournament was held in four venues:

Squads

Each national team have to submit a squad of 20 players (Regulations Article 39).

Group stage
The final tournament schedule was announced on 26 April 2019.

The group winners and runners-up advanced to the semi-finals and qualified for the 2021 FIFA U-20 Women's World Cup.

Tiebreakers
In the group stage, teams are ranked according to points (3 points for a win, 1 point for a draw, 0 points for a loss), and if tied on points, the following tiebreaking criteria are applied, in the order given, to determine the rankings (Regulations Articles 17.01 and 17.02):
Points in head-to-head matches among tied teams;
Goal difference in head-to-head matches among tied teams;
Goals scored in head-to-head matches among tied teams;
If more than two teams are tied, and after applying all head-to-head criteria above, a subset of teams are still tied, all head-to-head criteria above are reapplied exclusively to this subset of teams;
Goal difference in all group matches;
Goals scored in all group matches;
Penalty shoot-out if only two teams have the same number of points, and they met in the last round of the group and are tied after applying all criteria above (not used if more than two teams have the same number of points, or if their rankings are not relevant for qualification for the next stage);
Disciplinary points (red card = 3 points, yellow card = 1 point, expulsion for two yellow cards in one match = 3 points);
UEFA coefficient for the qualifying round draw;
Drawing of lots.

All times are local, BST (UTC+1).

Group A

Group B

Knockout stage
In the knockout stage, extra time and penalty shoot-out are used to decide the winner if necessary.

Bracket

Semi-finals

Final

Goalscorers

Team of the tournament
The UEFA technical observers selected the following 11 players for the team of the tournament:

Qualified teams for FIFA U-20 Women's World Cup
The following four teams from UEFA would have qualified for the 2020 FIFA U-20 Women's World Cup before the tournament was cancelled.

1 Bold indicates champions for that year. Italic indicates hosts for that year.

International Broadcasters

Television 
Up to all 16 live matches and highlights are available on UEFA.tv for all territories around the world.

Note : Live matches on UEFA.tv is not available in UK (Scotland as host, England as participants, and both non-participants (NI and Wales)) (matches not shown on BBC only), France, Germany, Israel, MENA, and USA.

Participating nations

Non-participating European nations

Outside Europe

Radio

Participating nations

Non-participating European nations

Outside Europe

References

External links

2019 #WU19EURO finals: Scotland, UEFA.com

 
2019
Women's Under-19 Championship
2019 Uefa Women's Under-19 Championship
2018–19 in Scottish football
2019 in women's association football
2019 in youth association football
2020 FIFA U-20 Women's World Cup qualification
July 2019 sports events in the United Kingdom